SYTOX (also known as SYTOX Green) is a high-affinity nucleic acid stain developed by biotechnology company Molecular Probes.  Because the stain only penetrates cells with compromised plasma membranes, it can be used to investigate antibacterial mechanism of action and confirm loss of bacterial viability.

References 

Staining dyes
Cyanine dyes